The National Ag Safety Database (NASD) was developed with funding from the United States National Institute for Occupational Safety and Health (NIOSH), the US Centers for Disease Control and Prevention, and the USDA Cooperative Extension Service (CES). The information contained in NASD was contributed by safety professionals and organizations from across the United States. Specifically, the objectives of the NASD project are: 1) to provide a national resource for the dissemination of information; 2) to educate workers and managers about occupational hazards associated with agriculture-related injuries, deaths and illnesses; 3) to provide prevention information; 4) to promote the consideration of safety and health issues in agricultural operations; and 5) to provide a convenient way for members of the agricultural safety and health community to share educational and research materials with their colleagues.

History

The original concept of NASD was a deliverable collection of safety materials contained within CD-ROMs, where the updates on CD would be periodically released. In October 1993, NIOSH provided funding through its Agricultural Health Promotion System (AHPS) grant program to develop the first CD-ROM NASD through the University of Florida's Cooperative Extension Service (CES). The first prototype of the CD-ROM collection was delivered to a select group of reviewers in October 1994, containing materials from institutions participating in the AHPS grant and from elsewhere. Reviewers provided their suggestions in a March 1995 workshop, and the general release occurred in June of the same year.

The Information Technology program associated with Florida CES was developing tools to deliver Extension publications electronically through the internet, and in October 1996, NIOSH funded a three-year program to update the database and convert the database into HTML format for delivery on the World-Wide Web. By October 1997, the entire database had been converted and a web-site was established. Expansion of the database continued, and CD-ROMs of the content were also produced during 1997 (NASD'97), 1998 (NASD '98), and 1999 (NASD '99). In 2001, NIOSH funded the program to expand and maintain NASD. In 2002, The Cooperative State Research, Education, and Extension Service (USDA-CREES) added funding support for NASD.

In 2002–2006, NIOSH funded NASD through the Southern Coastal Ag Center (SCAC). Dr. Carol Lehtola directed the project. In 2007–2009, NIOSH funded NASD through the University of Florida – again, Lehtola directed the project. After a four-year hiatus, in 2013 NIOSH resumed support for NASD with funding through the Central States Center for Agricultural Safety and Health (CSCASH), the Southeast Center for Agricultural Health and Injury Prevention (SCAHIP), and the High Plains Intermountain Center for Agricultural Health and Safety (HICAHS).

References

External links
 

American science websites
Bibliographic databases and indexes
Domain-specific search engines
Occupational safety and health
National Institute for Occupational Safety and Health
Databases in the United States
Agricultural databases
United States Department of Agriculture programs